The Philippines participated in the 1986 Asian Games held in Seoul, South Korea from September 20 to October 5, 1986. and ranked 6th with 4 gold medals, 5 silver medals and 9 bronze medals for a total of 18 over-all medals.

Asian Games Performance
Bong Coo emerged as the most successful Filipino campaigner with 2 gold medals in the (1) Individual ALL Events where she broke her own record in 24 games. She was also a member of the (2) Team of Five where the Philippines successfully defended their title in 1978 (bowling was not a part of the 1982 games). Other team members were Catalina Solis, Cecilia Gaffud, Rebecca Watanabe and Arianne Cerdeña.

Sprinter Lydia de Vega won the gold in the 100 meter and Ramon Brobio won the gold in individual men's golf.

Isidro del Prado, one of the country's greatest middle-distance runners of all time, won a silver in the 400 meter run, while boxer Leopoldo Cantancio lost in the lightweight class final to complete a five silver finish.

Basketball tasted a medal for the first time since 1962, winning the bronze medal with a gallant stand against powerhouses China and South Korea.

Medalists

The following Philippine competitors won medals at the Games.

Gold

Silver

Bronze

Multiple

Medal summary

Medal by sports

References

Nations at the 1986 Asian Games
1986
Asian Games